Events from the year 1848 in Denmark.

Incumbents
 Monarch – Christian VIII (until January 20), then Frederick VII
 Prime minister – Poul Christian Stemann (until 22 March), Adam Wilhelm Moltke

Events

 21 March – A large demonstration goes to Christiansborg Palace. Absolutism is abolished.
 The outbreak of the First Schleswig War
 9 April – The Battle of Bov, the first battle of the war, is won by Denmark.
 29 April – The Battle at Schleswig: Prussia has now entered the war and the German side has almost three times as many soldiers as Denmark, which has to withdraw to Funen. Jutland is left open to the German troops.
 3 July – Slavery is definitively abolished in the Danish West Indies. It is officially confirmed on 22 September.
 23 October – The Constitutional Assembly meets at Christiansborg Palace
 The Conventicle Act was repealed

Births
 16 September – Kristiane Konstantin-Hansen, weaver, textile artist, retailer and feminist (died 1925)
 28 December  Sophus Christopher Hauberg, industrialist (died 1920)

Deaths
 20 January – Christian VIII, King of Denmark (born 1786)
 29 January –  Peter Thonning, physician and botanist (born 1775)
 7 February – Christen Købke, painter (born 1810)
 26 March – Steen Steensen Blicher, author (born 1782)
 26 April – Johan Lundbye, painter (born 1818)
 29 August – Martinus Rørbye, painter (born 1803)

References

 
1840s in Denmark
Denmark
Years of the 19th century in Denmark